DGBX (David Grisman Bluegrass Experience), is a collection of bluegrass songs by David Grisman and his latest band, DGBX.

Track listing
 I'm Rollin' On (trad.)
 Baby Blue Eyes (Eanes)
 Engine 143 (Carter)
 The Baltimore Fire (Poole)
 Rubens Train (trad.)
 Dream of the Miner's Child (trad.)
 Dawggy Mt. Breakdown (Grisman)
 Rock Hearts (Otis)
 Say Won't You Be Mine (Stanley)
 You'll Be a Lost Ball (Martin)
 Down the Road (Flatt / Scruggs)
 Old and in the Way (Grisman)
 Are You Afraid to Die? (trad.)
 There Ain't Nobody Gonna Miss Me When I'm Gone (McCauliffe)

Personnel
David Grisman - mandolin, vocals
Samson Grisman - bass
Jim Nunally - guitar, vocals
Keith Little - banjo, guitar, vocals
Chad Manning - fiddle

References

David Grisman albums
2006 albums
Acoustic Disc albums